The 2008 European Judo Championships were the nineteenth edition of the European Judo Championships, held in the Altice Arena, in Lisbon, Portugal, from April 11 to April 13, 2008.

Medal overview

Men

Women

Medal table

Results overview

Men

−60 kg

−66 kg

−73 kg

−81 kg

−90 kg

−100 kg

+100 kg

Women

−48 kg

−52 kg

−57 kg

−63 kg

−70 kg

−78 kg

+78 kg

References
  Results of the 2008 European Judo Championships (JudoInside.com)

External links
 
 2008 EC Videos (judovision.org)

 
European Judo Championships
E
Judo, European Championships
European Championships 2008
Sports competitions in Lisbon
International sports competitions hosted by Portugal
2000s in Lisbon
European Judo Championships